Alexandru Repan (born 26 February 1940) is a Romanian actor. He appeared in more than forty films since 1963.

Selected filmography

References

External links 

1940 births
Living people
Romanian male film actors